Penetration depth is a measure of how deep light or any electromagnetic radiation can penetrate into a material. It is defined as the depth at which the intensity of the radiation inside the material falls to 1/e (about 37%) of its original value at (or more properly, just beneath) the surface.

When electromagnetic radiation is incident on the surface of a material, it may be (partly) reflected from that surface and there will be a field  containing energy transmitted into the material. This electromagnetic field interacts with the atoms and electrons inside the material. Depending on the nature of the material, the electromagnetic field might travel very far into the material, or may die out very quickly. For a given material, penetration depth will generally be a function of wavelength.

Beer–Lambert law
According to Beer–Lambert law, the intensity of an electromagnetic wave inside a material falls off exponentially from the surface as

 

If  denotes the penetration depth, we have 

Penetration depth is one term that describes the decay of electromagnetic waves inside of a material. The above definition refers to the depth  at which the intensity or power of the field decays to 1/e of its surface value. In many contexts one is concentrating on the field quantities themselves: the electric and magnetic fields in the case of electromagnetic waves.

Note that  is identical to the skin depth, the latter term usually applying to metals in reference to the decay of electrical currents (which follow the decay in the electric or magnetic field due to a plane wave incident on a bulk conductor). The attenuation constant   is also identical to the (negative) real part of the propagation constant, which may also be referred to as  using a notation inconsistent with the above use. It can also be ambiguous as to whether a positive number describes attenuation (reduction of the field) or gain; this is usually obvious from the context.

Attenuation constant
The attenuation constant for an electromagnetic wave at normal incidence on a material is also proportional to the imaginary part of the material's refractive index n.

Note that   is very much a function of frequency, as is its imaginary part which is often not mentioned (it is essentially zero for transparent dielectrics). The complex refractive index of metals is also infrequently mentioned but has the same significance, leading to a penetration depth (or skin depth ) accurately given by a formula which is valid up to microwave frequencies.

Relationships between these and other ways of specifying the decay of an electromagnetic field can be expressed by mathematical descriptions of opacity.

This is only specifying the decay of the field which may be due to absorption of the electromagnetic energy in a lossy medium or may simply describe the penetration of the field in a medium where no loss occurs (or a combination of the two). For instance, a hypothetical substance may have a complex index of refraction  . A different hypothetical material with a complex index of refraction   will also have a penetration depth of 16 wavelengths, however in this case the wave will be perfectly reflected from the material! No actual absorption of the radiation takes place, however the electric and magnetic fields extend well into the substance. In either case the penetration depth is found directly from the imaginary part of the material's refractive index as is detailed above.

See also
Skin effect
Absorbance
Attenuation coefficient
Transmittance

References

Electromagnetic radiation
Scattering, absorption and radiative transfer (optics)
Spectroscopy